Khaneh Sar (also Romanized as Khāneh Sar; also known as Khānsar-e Qāsemābād) is a village in Owshiyan Rural District, Chaboksar District, Rudsar County, Gilan Province, Iran. At the 2006 census, its population was 669, in 208 families.

References 

Populated places in Rudsar County